The Jianquan Taijiquan Association (also spelled as Chien-ch'uan T'ai Chi Ch'uan Association, Chian Chuan Taichi Chuan Association and in Chinese: 鑑泉太極拳社) is a well known school teaching Wu style t'ai chi ch'uan.

It was founded in 1935 by Wu Chien-ch'üan (Wu Jianquan, 吳鑑泉, 1870–1942) in Shanghai, and in the beginning operated out of the Shanghai YMCA. In 1937 Wu Kung-tsao opened a school in the British colony of Hong Kong during the Second Sino-Japanese War (1937–1945) in response to the ban on Chinese martial arts instituted by the Japanese. In 1942, when Wu Chien-ch'üan died, his oldest son Wu Kung-i became head of the Association, eventually moving its headquarters to the Hong Kong school where it has continued uninterrupted to this day. In English the Hong Kong branch and its subsidiaries call themselves "Wu's T'ai Chi Ch'uan Academies."

Wu Chien-ch'üan's daughter Wu Ying-hua and his eldest disciple Ma Yueh-liang led the branch in Shanghai after 1949. The Shanghai school fell under the ban on "feudalistic practices" with the beginning of the Cultural Revolution. Only in 1980 were they able to officially reopen.

References
Wu Kung-tsao. Wu Family T'ai Chi Ch'uan (吳家太極拳), Hong Kong, 1980, Toronto 2006, 
Journal of Asian Martial Arts Volume 15, No. 1, 2006. Via Media Publishing, Erie Pennsylvania USA. ISSN 1057-8358
 Taijiquan and the search for the little old Chinese man 2003 by Adam Dean Frank, Dissertation, The University of Texas at Austin, University of Texas Digital Repository

External links
International Wu Style Tai Chi Chuan Federation
Chian Chuan Taichi Chuan Association (Chinese)

Tai chi organizations